The Biharis is a demonym given to the inhabitants of the Indian state of Bihar. Bihari people can be separated into three main Indo-Aryan ethnolinguistic groups, Bhojpuris, Maithils and Magadhis. They are also further divided into a variety of hereditary caste groups.
In Bihar today, the Bihari identity is seen as secondary to caste/clan, linguistic and religious identity but nonetheless is a subset of the larger Indian identity. Biharis can be found throughout India, and in the neighbouring countries of Nepal, Pakistan and Bangladesh. During the Partition of India in 1947, many Bihari Muslims migrated to East Bengal (renamed to East Pakistan; later became Bangladesh). Bihari people are also well represented in the Muhajir people of Pakistan (formerly West Pakistan) because of Partition.

History

Bihar is one of the longest inhabited places in the world with a history going back to the Neolithic age. Since that time, Biharis have long been involved in some of the most important events in South Asian history. Biharis were the founders of many great empires based out of Magadh including the Nanda Empire, Maurya Empire and the Gupta Empire. All of these empires had their capitals in Pataliputra (modern-day Patna).
Two of India's major religions also have their origins in Bihar. Gautama Buddha who was the founder of Buddhism, achieved enlightenment in Bodh Gaya, Bihar. Mahavira, the founder of Jainism, was born in Vaishali in North Bihar.

Bihar is home to two UNESCO World Heritage Sites, the Mahabodhi temple at Bodh Gaya where the Buddha attained nirvana and the Buddhist monastic university of Nalanda. Until at least the 13th century, there was still a significant number of Buddhists in Bihar who mainly followed the Mahayana and Vajrayana schools until they were assimilated into Hinduism. However many village temples still retain idols of the Buddha and Bodhisattvas.

The founder of Sur Empire, Sher Shah Suri was born in Sasaram, a city in the state of Bihar in present-day India into a Pashtun family. During the period of Islamic rule, much of Bihar was under the sway of local Zamindars or chieftains who maintained their own armies and territories. These chieftains retained much of their power until the arrival of the British East India Company.

Martial tradition

Many academics including Dirk Kolff and Walter Hauser have noted that Bihar has a history of armed activism among its peasantry. For centuries, Purbiya soldiers from Western Bihar have long served as soldiers in the armies of Kings in Western regions of India. Mughal sources also record that many peasant soldiers were recruited from Northern parts of Bihar (Tirhut). 

In late nineteenth and early twentieth century, the middle peasant castes like Koeri, Kurmi and Yadav, also got recruitment in the British Indian Army as soldiers. According to William Pinch, specially after 1898, the social resurgence and claim for higher status in the social hierarchy, attracted the peasant communities towards the military service.

The Bihari Soldiers of British army played a major role in the Indian Rebellion of 1857 against the British following the suppression of the uprising, British authorities decided not to recruit troops from Bihar. Then they decided to recruit troops from Sikh and Muslim Communities of the Punjab.
This martial heritage continued into the late 20th century with the formation of private armies or senas that were formed to maintain the interests of specific castes.

Servan-Schreiber described this martial tradition as follows:

Clothing
 
 
 
The traditional dress of Bihari people includes the dhoti-mirjai (a modified form of the flowing jama) or the kurta (replacing the older chapkan which is a robe fastened on the right or on the left) for men and Saree for women. In rural Bihar, men also wear a sort of plaid called Gamchha, which is often tied around the head as turban or headscarf and sometimes thrown round the body or over the shoulders. In everyday life women wear saree or Salwar kameez. The saree is worn in "Seedha Aanchal" style traditionally. Nevertheless, Western shirts and trousers are becoming popular among both the rural and urban male population. And Salwar-Kameez for women in urban Bihar. Jewellery such as rings for men and bangles for women are popular. However, there are some traditional Bihari jewelries like "Chhara", "Hansuli", "Kamarbandh", etc.

Language and literature

 Hindi is the official language of the State. Maithili (61 million speakers including Bajjika dialect which has 11 million speakers in India), and Urdu are other recognised languages of the state. Unrecognised languages of the state are Bhojpuri (60 million), Angika (30 million) and Magahi (20 million). Bhojpuri and Magahi are sociolinguistically a part of the Hindi Belt languages fold, thus they were not granted official status in the state.The number of speakers of the Bihari languages is difficult to count because of unreliable sources. In the urban region, most educated speakers of the language name Hindi as their language because this is what they use in formal contexts and believe it to be the appropriate response because of unawareness. The uneducated and the rural population of the region regards Hindi as the generic name for their language.

Despite the large number of speakers of Bihari languages, they have not been constitutionally recognized in India, except Maithili which is recognised under the Eighth Schedule of the Constitution of India. Hindi is the language used for educational and official matters in Bihar. These languages was legally absorbed under the subordinate label of Hindi in the 1961 Census. Such state and national politics are creating conditions for language endangerment.
The first success for spreading Hindi occurred in Bihar in 1881, when Hindi displaced Urdu as the sole official language of the province. In this struggle between competing Hindi and Urdu, the potential claims of the three large mother tongues in the region – Bhojpuri, Maithili and Magahi were ignored. After independence Hindi was again given the sole official status through the Bihar Official Language Act, 1950. Urdu became the second official language in the undivided State of Bihar on 16 August 1989. Bihar also produced several eminent Urdu writers including Sulaiman Nadvi, Manazir Ahsan Gilani, Abdul Qavi Desnavi, Paigham Afaqui, Jabir Husain, Sohail Azimabadi, Hussain Ul Haque, Dr. Shamim Hashimi, Wahab Ashrafi etc.

Bihar has produced a number of writers of Hindi, including Raja Radhika Raman Singh, Shiva Pujan Sahay, Divakar Prasad Vidyarthy, Ramdhari Singh 'Dinkar', Ram Briksh Benipuri, Phanishwar Nath 'Renu', Gopal Singh "Nepali" and Baba Nagarjun. Mahapandit Rahul Sankrityayan, the great writer and Buddhist scholar, was born in U.P. but spent his life in the land of Buddha, i.e., Bihar. Hrishikesh Sulabh and Neeraj Singh (from Ara) are the prominent writer of the new generation. They are short story writer, playwright and theatre critic. Arun Kamal and Aalok Dhanwa are the well-known poets. Different regional languages also have produced some prominent poets and authors. Sharat Chandra Chattopadhyay, who is among the greatest writers in Bengali, resided for some time in Bihar. Upamanyu Chatterjee also hails from Patna in Bihar. Devaki Nandan Khatri, who rose to fame at the beginning of the 20th century on account of his novels such as Chandrakanta and Chandrakanta Santati, was born in Muzaffarpur, Bihar. Vidyapati Thakur is the most renowned poet of Maithili (c. 14–15th century). Satyapal Chandra has written many English bestseller novels and he is one of India's emerging young writer.

Castes and ethnic groups
Bihari society follows a very rigid caste system, which influences daily life and politics.

The 2011 Census of India indicated that Scheduled Castes constituted 15% of Bihar's 10.4 crores population. The census identified 21 of 23 Dalit sub-castes as Mahadalits. The Mahadalit community consists of the following sub-castes: Bantar, Bauri, Bhogta, Bhuiya, Chaupal, Dabgar, Dom (Dhangad), Ghasi, Halalkhor, Hari (Mehtar, Bhangi), Kanjar, Kurariar, Lalbegi, Musahar, Nat, Pan (Swasi), Rajwar, Turi, Dhobi, Chamar and Dusadh. The Paswan caste was initially left out of the Mahadalit category, to the consternation of Ram Vilas Paswan. Scheduled Tribes constituted around 1.3% of the Bihari population. They include the Gond, Santhal and Tharu communities. There are about 130 Extremely Backward Castes (EBCs) in Bihar.

Religion

According to the 2011 census, 82.7% of Bihar's population practiced Hinduism, while 16.9% followed Islam.

Bihari politics

The politics of Bihar is influenced by caste and religion based consciousness to a large extent. The upper castes dominated the politics and political parties till 1967. But after 1967, the resurgence of middle castes took place and the castes like Koeri, Yadav and Kurmi replaced the upper castes in political scenario. Some Dalit caste like Paswan and Chamar also performed well in politics, Bhola Paswan Shastri and Ram Sundar Das were former Chief Ministers from respective caste and Jagjivan Ram became Deputy Prime Minister and first Labour Minister of India. Since 1990, the Politics of Bihar  is dominated by regional political parties like Janata Dal (United) and Rashtriya Janata Dal, while a number of small parties like Rashtriya Jan Jan Party, Plural party, Rashtriya Lok Samta Party and Jan Adhikar Party are also active.

Bihari sub-nationalism
In 1923, a special session of the Congress took place in Delhi. During this session, an issue of sitting arrangement came up whereby the delegates from Bihar were not given seats in the front row. Maghfoor Ahmad Ajazi registered his objection to this discriminatory arrangement after which Bihari delegates were also given appropriate seats. His protest was admittedly on the issue of self-respect of the Biharis.

According to social scientist Dr. Shaibal Gupta, the beating of students from Bihar in Mumbai in October 2008 has consolidated Bihari sub-nationalism.

See also
 Anti-Bihari sentiment
 Bihari diaspora
 Bihari Mauritian
 List of people from Bihar
 List of people from Jharkhand

References

Bibliography

 
 

Indo-Aryan peoples
Bihar
Social groups of Pakistan
Ethnic groups in Bangladesh
Ethnic groups in India